Sugar Dome is an American reality-competition series on the Food Network. The series debuted on November 25, 2012. The series showcases three teams of culinary artists as they compete by creating extravagant food for the ultimate chance to be rewarded with $15,000.

Cast
David Bull as host.
Paulette Goto as a judge.
Pichet Ong as a judge.

Episodes

References

External links
 Official Page
 Sugar Dome on Internet Movie Database
 Sugar Dome on TV.com

2012 American television series debuts
Food Network original programming